Dancer and the Moon is the ninth studio album by the group Blackmore's Night, released on June 11, 2013. It entered at # 189 on USA's Billboard Album Charts. It was also nominated for NAR award in Best Vocal Album of the Year.

"Carry On… Jon" is an instrumental tribute to Deep Purple co-founder Jon Lord, who died on 16 July 2012 at age 71.

Track listing

Personnel
Ritchie Blackmore – acoustic and electric guitars, nickelharpe, mandola, hurdy gurdy, tambourine
Candice Night – lead vocals, harmony vocals, all renaissance and medieval woodwinds
Bard David of Larchmont (David Baranowski) – keyboards, backing vocals
Lady Kelly DeWinter (Kelly Morris) – harmony vocals, French horn
Earl Grey of Chimay (Mike Clemente) – bass and rhythm guitar
The Scarlet Fiddler (Claire Smith Bermingham) – violin
Troubador of Aberdeen (David Keith) – percussion
Pat Regan - producer, sound engineer, orchestral arrangements

Chart performance

References

Blackmore's Night albums
2013 albums